Mystic is an unincorporated community in Pennington County, in the U.S. state of South Dakota.

History
A post office called Mystic was established in 1895, and remained in operation until 1954. It was supposed that the local Native Americans believed the surrounding area to be full of mystery, hence the name. A former variant name was Sitting Bull.

References

Unincorporated communities in Pennington County, South Dakota
Unincorporated communities in South Dakota